Annetenna is the only studio album of Los Angeles band Annetenna. The album was paid for and recorded for Columbia Records, but was shelved because of reorganisation within that company. As such, the album was eventually self-released by the band through their website.

Track listing
"Ultraviolet" – 3:55
"Oblivion" – 4:22
"Halo" – 4:03
"74 Willow" – 4:17
"Extraordinary" – 4:14
"What We Are Not" – 4:36
"Don't Think About It Now" – 3:54
"Homewrecker" – 4:11
"This Is Not A Love Song" – 3:54
"My Favorite Song" – 4:30
"From All Sides" – 4:06

Annetenna albums
2001 debut albums
Columbia Records albums